Robert William Irvine (29 April 1900 in Lisburn, Ireland – 1979 in Leicester, England) was an Irish footballer. He played as a centre or inside forward.

A sublime dribbler and a master of ball control, Bobby Irvine was amongst the most gifted attacking players of his generation. Signed by Everton FC for £500 in September 1921, he made his Football League debut in a 1-1 draw against Liverpool F.C. in November 1921 at Anfield. He quickly became a crowd favourite at Goodison Park - his bravery and determination coupled with his thrilling skills entertained the fans for six seasons. More of a creator than a scorer, Irvine normally played at inside-right, but when deployed at centre-forward he proved an effective goal-getter, best illustrated by a hat-trick against Aston Villa in January 1922.

First selected for Ireland in March 1922, Irvine played at centre-forward in a 2-1 defeat by Scotland. Indeed, five of his first six caps were won leading the attack. An early personal best performance came with two goals in a 3-0 win over Wales in Wrexham, but he will be best remembered for his role in 2-1 and 2-0 defeats of England at Windsor Park in 1923 and 1927, and for his goal that gave his country a 3-2 lead at Anfield in 1926, only for the game to finish 3-3.

Troubled by injuries through a number of spells of his career, Irvine left Everton in March 1928 having made just nine appearances in what was a title winning campaign for the Toffees. Snapped up by Portsmouth FC, he made his Fratton Park debut in a 1-0 win over Manchester United on 17 March. He helped his new club to the FA Cup final in 1929, but injury robbed him of a place in the final line-up as they lost 2-0 to Bolton Wanderers. In August 1929 Irvine joined Welsh club, Connah's Quay, where he became the only player from that club to be capped for Ireland.

With Connah's Quay suffering severe financial difficulties, Irvine returned to Northern Ireland, signing for Derry City. He marked his Brandywell debut with a goal in a 1-0 Gold Cup quarter-final win over Larne on 3 September 1930. With Derry, Irvine took his caps total to 15, and in October 1932 also played twice for the Irish League, in 5-2 and 4-1 defeats by the English and Scottish Leagues respectively. During this period Irvine also briefly turned out for Chester, scoring nine times in 13 games in the Cheshire County League shortly before they were elected to The Football League in 1931.

Irvine returned to England in May 1933 with Division Three (South) club, Watford FC. He played his last Football League match in early 1934, officially hanging up his boots in April 1935. With his playing days on the wane, it was written of him: "There is no man who takes harder knocks and squeals less than Irvine." In total, he won 15 international caps and scored 3 goals.

Everton playing record

League appearances 199, goals 54

FA Cup appearances 15, goals 3

References

External links
Northern Ireland’s Footballing Greats

1900 births
1979 deaths
Irish association footballers (before 1923)
Pre-1950 IFA international footballers
Everton F.C. players
Portsmouth F.C. players
Derry City F.C. players
Watford F.C. players
Chester City F.C. players
English Football League players
Ulster Scots people
Association football forwards
Sportspeople from Lisburn